Virgin Fugs is a 1967 album by The Fugs.  While it is their third released album, it consists of outtakes from the two 1965 sessions for their first album, The Village Fugs (also released as The Fugs First Album).  While that album emphasized the second recording session, this compilation favors the first, making this arguably their chronologically "real first" album.  It was released on ESP Disc (ESP 1038), possibly without the foreknowledge or permission of the Fugs.  Their site refers to it as a bootleg, though it was distributed through the same channels as their authorized previous ESP album.  ESP followed this release with a 1975 compilation including seven more outtakes from these sessions, Fugs 4, Rounders Score.

Original copies of this ESP-Disk LP contained a bumper sticker which read "FUG-CUE"

Four tracks from Virgin Fugs were released as bonus tracks on the CD version of The Fugs First Album.

Bob Dylan featured and writes about "C.I.A. Man" in his book "The Philosophy of Modern Song".

Track listing
Side one
"We're the Fugs" (Ed Sanders) – 1:09A ^
"New Amphetamine Shriek" (Peter Stampfel) – 2:18
"Saran Wrap" (Sanders) – 1:12
"The Ten Commandments" (Tuli Kupferberg and GOD) – 2:50 ^
"Hallucination Horrors" (Kupferberg) – 2:03
"I Command the House of the Devil" (Sanders) – 3:22
Side two
"C.I.A. Man" (Kupferberg) – 2:48 ^
"Coca Cola Douche" (Kupferberg) – 1:35
"My Bed Is Getting Crowded"  (Kupferberg) – 2:30
"Caca Rocka" (Kupferberg) – 1:30
"I Saw the Best Minds of My Generation Rot" (Allen Ginsberg, Sanders) – 4:43 ^

^ Tracks A1, A4, B1, B5 released as bonus tracks on The Fugs First Album CD.

Personnel

Performance
Ed Sanders – vocals, percussion
Tuli Kupferberg – vocals, percussion
Peter Stampfel – fiddle, harmonica, guitar, banjo, vocals
Steve Weber – guitar, vocals
Vinny Leary  – guitar, vocals
Lee Crabtree – keyboards, percussion, vocals
John Anderson – bass guitar, vocals
Ken Weaver – drums, vocals

Production
Ed Sanders – producer,
Harry Smith – producer

Additional sources
The Fugs Store: The Fugs First Album

References

The Fugs albums
1967 albums
ESP-Disk albums
Albums produced by Ed Sanders